Anthony Akhulia is a former Kenyan defender who currently serves as the head coach at Kenyan Premier League side Bidco United F.C.

Career 
Akhulia started out as a player at Bidco United F.C. in 2007 while working at Bidco Africa as a casual labourer.

He later graduated to a kit manager, then team manager, assistant coach, and interim coach before finally taking the reigns of head coach upon exit of Robert Matano in 2017. He led the team to the Kenyan topflight in the year 2020.

Certification
Akhulia is KNVB trained and holds CAF 'D', CAF 'C', and CAF 'B' coaching licences.

Honours

Club
Bidco United
Kenyan National Super League
 Runners-up (1): 2019-20
Betway Cup
 Second runners-up (1): 2021

References

1984 births
Living people
Kenyan footballers
Football managers in Kenya